In mathematical physics, the gamma matrices, also called the Dirac matrices, are a set of conventional matrices with specific anticommutation relations that ensure they generate a matrix representation of the Clifford algebra Cl1,3(). It is also possible to define higher-dimensional gamma matrices.  When interpreted as the matrices of the action of a set of orthogonal basis vectors for contravariant vectors in Minkowski space, the column vectors on which the matrices act become a space of spinors, on which the Clifford algebra of spacetime acts. This in turn makes it possible to represent infinitesimal spatial rotations and Lorentz boosts. Spinors facilitate spacetime computations in general, and in particular are fundamental to the Dirac equation for relativistic spin- particles.

In Dirac representation, the four contravariant gamma matrices are

 is the time-like, Hermitian matrix. The other three are space-like, anti-Hermitian matrices.

The gamma matrices have a group structure, the gamma group, that is shared by all matrix representations of the group, in any dimension, for any signature of the metric. For example, the Pauli matrices are a set of "gamma" matrices in dimension 3 with metric of Euclidean signature (3, 0). In 5 spacetime dimensions, the 4 gammas above together with the fifth gamma-matrix to be presented below generate the Clifford algebra.

Mathematical structure
The defining property for the gamma matrices to generate a Clifford algebra is the anticommutation relation
 

This defining property is more fundamental than the numerical values used in the specific representation of the gamma matrices.  Covariant gamma matrices are defined by
 
and Einstein notation is assumed.

Note that the other sign convention for the metric,  necessitates either a change in the defining equation:
 
Under the alternative sign convention for the metric the covariant gamma matrices are then defined by

Physical structure
Spacetime is assumed to be endowed with the Minkowski metric . A space of bispinors, is also assumed at every point in spacetime, endowed with the bispinor representation of the Lorentz group.

If  belongs to a representation of the Lorentz group, then the induced action  will also belong to a representation of the Lorentz group, see Representation theory of the Lorentz group.

 

showing that the quantity of  can be viewed as a basis of a representation space of the 4 vector representation of the Lorentz group sitting inside the Clifford algebra. The last identity can be recognized as the defining relationship for matrices belonging to an indefinite orthogonal group, which is  written in indexed notation. This means that quantities of the form

 

should be treated as 4 vectors in manipulations. It also means that indices can be raised and lowered on the  using the metric  as with any 4 vector. The notation is called the Feynman slash notation. The transformation rule for slashed quantities is simply

 

The designation of the 4 tuple  as a 4 vector sometimes found in the literature is thus a slight misnomer. The latter transformation corresponds to an active transformation of the components of a slashed quantity in terms of the basis , and the former to a passive transformation of the basis  itself.

The elements  form a representation of the Lie algebra of the Lorentz group. This is a spin representation. The 6 dimensional space the  span is the representation space of a tensor representation of the Lorentz group. For the higher order elements of the Clifford algebra in general and their transformation rules, see the article Dirac algebra. The spin representation of the Lorentz group is encoded in the spin group  (for real, uncharged spinors) and in the complexified spin group  for charged (Dirac) spinors.

Expressing the Dirac equation

In natural units, the Dirac equation may be written as

where  is a Dirac spinor.

Switching to Feynman notation, the Dirac equation is

The fifth "gamma" matrix, 5
 (in the Dirac basis).
Although  uses the letter gamma, it is not one of the gamma matrices of Cl1,3().

 has also an alternative form:

using the convention , or

using the convention .
Proof:

This can be seen by exploiting the fact that all the four gamma matrices anticommute, so 
,
where  is the type (4,4) generalized Kronecker delta in 4 dimensions,  in full antisymmetrization. If  denotes the Levi-Civita symbol in n dimensions, we can use the identity .
Then we get, using the convention ,

This matrix is useful in discussions of quantum mechanical chirality. For example, a Dirac field can be projected onto its left-handed and right-handed components by:
.

Some properties are:
 It is Hermitian:
 
 Its eigenvalues are ±1, because:
 
 It anticommutes with the four gamma matrices:
 

 , and

Five dimensions
The Clifford algebra in odd dimensions behaves like two copies of the Clifford algebra of one less dimension, a left copy and a right copy. Thus, one can employ a bit of a trick to repurpose   as one of the generators of the Clifford algebra in five dimensions. In this case, the set  therefore, by the last two properties (keeping in mind that ) and those of the ‘old’ gammas, forms the basis of the Clifford algebra in  spacetime dimensions for the metric signature .
This pattern is repeated for spacetime dimension  even and the next odd dimension  for all . For more detail, see higher-dimensional gamma matrices.

Identities
The following identities follow from the fundamental anticommutation relation, so they hold in any basis (although the last one depends on the sign choice for ).

Miscellaneous identities
1. 

2. 

3. 

4. 

5. 

6. , where

Trace identities
The gamma matrices obey the following trace identities:

Proving the above involves the use of three main properties of the trace operator:
 tr(A + B) = tr(A) + tr(B) 
 tr(rA) = r tr(A) 
 tr(ABC) = tr(CAB) = tr(BCA)

This implies 
|}

This can only be fulfilled if

The extension to 2n + 1 (n integer) gamma matrices, is found by placing two gamma-5s after (say) the 2n-th gamma-matrix in the trace, commuting one out to the right (giving a minus sign) and commuting the other gamma-5 2n steps out to the left [with sign change (-1)^2n = 1]. Then we use cyclic identity to get the two gamma-5s together, and hence they square to identity, leaving us with the trace equalling minus itself, i.e. 0.
|}

|}

For the term on the right, we'll continue the pattern of swapping  with its neighbor to the left,
{|
|
|
|-
|
|
|}

Again, for the term on the right swap  with its neighbor to the left,
{|
|
|
|-
|
|
|}

Eq (3) is the term on the right of eq (2), and eq (2) is the term on the right of eq (1). We'll also use identity number 3 to simplify terms like so:

So finally Eq (1), when you plug all this information in gives

The terms inside the trace can be cycled, so

So really (4) is

or

|}

Add  to both sides of the above to see
.

Now, this pattern can also be used to show 
.

Anticommute three times instead of once, picking up three minus signs, and cycle using the cyclic property of the trace.

So,
.
|}

Now,
{|
|
|
|(since trace is invariant under similarity transformations)
|-
|
|
|(since trace is invariant under transposition)
|-
|
|
|(since the trace of a product of gamma matrices is real)
|}
|}

Normalization
The gamma matrices can be chosen with extra hermiticity conditions which are restricted by the above anticommutation relations however. We can impose
, compatible with 

and for the other gamma matrices (for )
, compatible with 

One checks immediately that these hermiticity relations hold for the Dirac representation.

The above conditions can be combined in the relation

The hermiticity conditions are not invariant under the action  of a Lorentz transformation  because  is not necessarily a unitary transformation due to the non-compactness of the Lorentz group.

Charge conjugation
The charge conjugation operator, in any basis, may be defined as

where  denotes the matrix transpose. The explicit form that  takes is dependent on the specific representation chosen for the gamma matrices (its form expressed as product of the gamma matrices is representation dependent, while it can be seen  in the Dirac basis:

which fails to hold in the Majorana basis, for example). This is because although charge conjugation is an automorphism of the gamma group, it is not an inner automorphism (of the group). Conjugating matrices can be found, but they are representation-dependent.

Representation-independent identities include:

In addition, for all four representations given below (Dirac, Majorana and both chiral variants), one has

Feynman slash notation 
The Feynman slash notation is defined by

for any 4-vector .

Here are some similar identities to the ones above, but involving slash notation:

 for  odd.

Many follow directly from expanding out the slash notation and contracting expressions of the form  with the appropriate identity in terms of gamma matrices.

Other representations
The matrices are also sometimes written using the 2×2 identity matrix, and

where k runs from 1 to 3 and the σk are Pauli matrices.

Dirac basis
The gamma matrices we have written so far are appropriate for acting on Dirac spinors written in the Dirac basis; in fact, the Dirac basis is defined by these matrices. To summarize, in the Dirac basis:

In the Dirac basis, the charge conjugation operator is real antisymmetric,

Weyl (chiral) basis
Another common choice is the Weyl or chiral basis, in which  remains the same but  is different, and so  is also different, and diagonal,

or in more compact notation:

The Weyl basis has the advantage that its chiral projections take a simple form,

The idempotence of the chiral projections is manifest.

By slightly abusing the notation and reusing the symbols  we can then identify

The charge conjugation operator in this basis is real antisymmetric,

The Dirac basis can be obtained from the Weyl basis as 

via the unitary transform

Weyl (chiral) basis (alternate form)
Another possible choice of the Weyl basis has

The chiral projections take a slightly different form from the other Weyl choice,

In other words,

The charge conjugation operator in this basis is 

This basis can be obtained from the Dirac basis above as  via the unitary transform

Majorana basis
There is also the Majorana basis, in which all of the Dirac matrices are imaginary, and the spinors and Dirac equation are real. Regarding the Pauli matrices, the basis  can be written as

where  is the charge conjugation matrix, which matches the Dirac version defined above.

(The reason for making all gamma matrices imaginary is solely to obtain the particle physics metric , in which squared masses are positive. The Majorana representation, however, is real.

The Majorana basis can be obtained from the Dirac basis above as  via the unitary transform

Cl1,3(ℂ) and Cl1,3(ℝ) 
 
The Dirac algebra can be regarded as a complexification of the real algebra Cl1,3(), called the space time algebra:

Cl1,3() differs from Cl1,3(): in Cl1,3() only real linear combinations of the gamma matrices and their products are allowed.

Two things deserve to be pointed out. As Clifford algebras, Cl1,3() and Cl4() are isomorphic, see classification of Clifford algebras. The reason is that the underlying signature of the spacetime metric loses its signature (1,3) upon passing to the complexification. However, the transformation required to bring the bilinear form to the complex canonical form is not a Lorentz transformation and hence not "permissible" (at the very least impractical) since all physics is tightly knit to the Lorentz symmetry and it is preferable to keep it manifest.

Proponents of geometric algebra strive to work with real algebras wherever that is possible. They argue that it is generally possible (and usually enlightening) to identify the presence of an imaginary unit in a physical equation. Such units arise from one of the many quantities in a real Clifford algebra that square to −1, and these have geometric significance because of the properties of the algebra and the interaction of its various subspaces.  Some of these proponents also question whether it is necessary or even useful to introduce an additional imaginary unit in the context of the Dirac equation.

In the mathematics of Riemannian geometry, it is conventional to define the Clifford algebra Clp,q() for arbitrary dimensions . The Weyl spinors transform under the action of the spin group . The complexification of the spin group, called the spinc group , is a product  of the spin group with the circle  The product  just a notational device to identify  with  The geometric point of this is that it disentangles the real spinor, which is covariant under Lorentz transformations, from the  component, which can be identified with the  fiber of the electromagnetic interaction. The  is entangling parity and charge conjugation in a manner suitable for relating the Dirac particle/anti-particle states (equivalently, the chiral states in the Weyl basis). The bispinor, insofar as it has linearly independent left and right components, can interact with the electromagnetic field. This is in contrast to the Majorana spinor and the ELKO spinor, which cannot (i.e. they are electrically neutral), as they explicitly constrain the spinor so as to not interact with the  part coming from the complexification.

However, in contemporary practice in physics, the Dirac algebra rather than the space-time algebra continues to be the standard environment the spinors of the Dirac equation "live" in.

Other representation-free properties 

Further, the multiplicity of each eigenvalue is two.

More generally, if  is not null, a similar result holds. The negative case follows similarly.

This means the solution space for plane wave solutions to Dirac's equation has dimension 2. 

This result still holds for the massless Dirac equation. In other words, if  null, then  has nullity 2.

Euclidean Dirac matrices
In quantum field theory one can Wick rotate the time axis to transit from Minkowski space to Euclidean space. This is particularly useful in some renormalization procedures as well as lattice gauge theory. In Euclidean space, there are two commonly used representations of Dirac matrices:

Chiral representation

Notice that the factors of  have been inserted in the spatial gamma matrices so that the Euclidean Clifford algebra

will emerge.  It is also worth noting that there are variants of this which insert instead  on one of the matrices, such as in lattice QCD codes which use the chiral basis.

In Euclidean space,

Using the anti-commutator and noting that in Euclidean space , one shows that

In chiral basis in Euclidean space,

which is unchanged from its Minkowski version.

Non-relativistic representation

Footnotes

See also 

Pauli matrices
Gell-Mann matrices
Higher-dimensional gamma matrices
Fierz identity

References

External links
Dirac matrices on mathworld including their group properties
Dirac matrices as an abstract group on GroupNames
 

Spinors
Matrices
Clifford algebras
Articles containing proofs